
Erich-Heinrich Clößnerr (17 September 1888  – 28 March 1976) was a German general during World War II who held commands at the divisional and corps levels.  He was a recipient of the Knight's Cross of the Iron Cross of Nazi Germany.

Awards and decorations

 Knight's Cross of the Iron Cross on  29 September 1940 as Generalleutnant and commander of 25. Infanterie-Division 
 German Cross in Gold on 15 July 1942 as General der Infanterie and commanding general of the LIII. Armeekorps

References

Citations

Bibliography

 
 

1888 births
1976 deaths
People from Giessen
German Army personnel of World War I
German Army generals of World War II
Generals of Infantry (Wehrmacht)
Recipients of the clasp to the Iron Cross, 1st class
Recipients of the Gold German Cross
Recipients of the Knight's Cross of the Iron Cross
German prisoners of war in World War II
People from Hesse-Nassau
Reichswehr personnel
Military personnel from Hesse